Thomas Wapp (born 29 January 1972) is a Swiss badminton player. He competed in two events at the 1996 Summer Olympics.

References

1972 births
Living people
Swiss male badminton players
Olympic badminton players of Switzerland
Badminton players at the 1996 Summer Olympics
Place of birth missing (living people)